The 1967–68 North Regional League was the 10th in the history of the North Regional League, a football competition in England.

League table

External links
North Regional League
1958/59 North Regional League

1967–68 in English football leagues
North Regional League